Aaron Lewis Henry (born 31 August 2003) is an English footballer who plays as a midfielder for Charlton Athletic.

Club career

Charlton Athletic
Henry made his professional debut with Charlton Athletic in a 1–0 FA Cup loss to West Bromwich Albion on 4 January 2020. In October 2020, he signed a professional contract with Charlton until 2023.

He scored his first goal for Charlton in an EFL Cup tie against Queens Park Rangers on 9 August 2022.

Wealdstone (loan)
On 4 February 2022, Henry joined Wealdstone on an initial one-month loan, which was extended until the end of the season in March 2022.

On 19 March 2022, Henry scored his first senior goal, a 25 yard free kick in an eventual 4-2 defeat to Stockport County. Henry played a total of 20 times for Wealdstone, scoring one further goal for the club, also a free kick, in a 2-0 victory over Boreham Wood.

Career statistics

References

External links

CAFC Profile

2003 births
Living people
English footballers
England youth international footballers
Association football midfielders
Charlton Athletic F.C. players
Wealdstone F.C. players
English Football League players
National League (English football) players